"Mi Gna" (meaning "Don't Go") is a song in Armenian and English by Armenian-American rapper Super Sako (Sarkis Balasanyan) and features vocals by the Armenian rabiz singer Spitakci Hayko (Hayk Ghevondyan).

"Mi Gna" was written by Artak Aramyan with added English lyrics by Super Sako and appeared in his 2016 album Love Crimes. The song was uploaded to YouTube on August 17, 2016, and without the release of any official music video for the song, it became a huge hit in Armenia, the Armenian diaspora, Turkey, the Arab countries, and elsewhere worldwide. The video attracted 50 million views by June 2017, making it the most viewed song on YouTube by Armenian artists, not including songs by American band System of a Down. The video has garnered more than 186 million views as of December 2019.

Maître Gims Remix

The song was covered by Congolese-French singer and rapper Maître Gims in a trilingual Armenian, French and English version titled "Mi Gna (Maître Gims Remix)". This version included additional French-language lyrics by Maître Gims and Araik Mouradian and was produced by Gims and MG Mouradian. The remix was released on 19 January 2018 in France. The release was  accompanied by an official music video filmed in New York and Directed By Adam Nael. The video with Maître Gims version has attracted 255 million views as of August 2022.

In its first week of release in France on Chahawat / B1 labels and distributed by Sony Music, "Mi Gna (Maître Gims Remix)" entered the French Singles Chart at number 7, peaking eventually at number 4. It also reached #14 on the SNEP Telecharged Singles chart and #35 on SNEP "Top Singles - Streaming" chart. In Belgium, where the single is released by Play Two and distributed by Warner Music, it reached number 38 in the Belgian Ultratop Wallonia chart. and peaked at number 8 on Belgian Wallonia Urban Top 50 Chart. The single also charted in the Swiss Hitparade, entering at number 74.

"Mi Gna" was included in Maître Gims' 2018 album Ceinture noire that made it to the number one position on the French SNEP Albums chart, on the Swiss Hitparade Albums chart and on the Ultratop Belgian (Wallonia) Albums chart.

Versions

Language versions
The song has been subject to a great number language versions including:

There are also versions in Albanian, Assyrian, Dutch, German and Russian amongst many.

Samplings and adaptations
Armenian singer Agas released an adaptation "Nazani, Mi Gna, Sirun Kuku" sampling heavily from the song.

"Mi Gna" has also been subject to many remixes, samplings and adaptations notably by DJ Pantelis (Greece).

In 2021, the South Asian artist CAPS sampled on the song in his hit "Shoulda Never" that charted in UK's Asian Charts.

Charts

Weekly charts

Year-end charts

Certifications

References

External links
Super Sako Official website
Super Sako YouTube channel
Super Sako YouTube channel: Super Sako - "Mi Gna" ft. Hayko
Maître Gims YouTube channel: Maître Gims & Super Sako - "Mi Gna" ft. Hayko

Macaronic songs
Armenian songs
Armenian-language songs
2016 songs
2017 singles
2018 songs
2018 singles
Gims songs